The 2017 Western Illinois Leathernecks football team represented Western Illinois University in the 2017 NCAA Division I FCS football season. They were led by second-year head coach Charlie Fisher and played their home games at Hanson Field. They were a member of the Missouri Valley Football Conference (MVFC). They finished the season 8–4, 5–3 in MVFC play to finish in fourth place. They received an at-large bid to the FCS Playoffs where they lost to Weber State in the first round.

On December 22, Fisher resigned to become the wide receivers coach at Arizona State. He finished at Western Illinois with a two-year record of 14–9.

Schedule

Source: Schedule

Game summaries

at Tennessee Tech

at Northern Arizona

at Coastal Carolina

South Dakota

at Northern Iowa

Missouri State

at North Dakota State

South Dakota State

at Illinois State

at Indiana State

Southern Illinois

FCS Playoffs

at Weber State–First Round

Ranking movements

References

Western Illinois
Western Illinois Leathernecks football seasons
Western Illinois
Western Illinois Leathernecks football